Aïn Babouche District is a district of Oum El Bouaghi Province, Algeria.

Municipalities
The district is further divided into 2 municipalities:
Aïn Babouche
Aïn Diss

References

Districts of Oum El Bouaghi Province